Sar Peri (also Romanized as Sar Perī and Sar Parī) is a village in Dehdasht-e Gharbi Rural District, in the Central District of Kohgiluyeh County, Kohgiluyeh and Boyer-Ahmad Province, Iran. At the 2006 census, its population was 552, in 104 families.

References 

Populated places in Kohgiluyeh County